Charles Norman Atkins (29 January 1885 – 25 October 1960) was an Australian politician.

He was born in Hobart. In 1941 he was elected to the Tasmanian House of Assembly as a Nationalist member for Denison. He served until his retirement in 1948. Atkins died in Hobart in 1960.

References

1885 births
1960 deaths
Nationalist Party of Australia members of the Parliament of Tasmania
Liberal Party of Australia members of the Parliament of Tasmania
Members of the Tasmanian House of Assembly
Politicians from Hobart
20th-century Australian politicians